Denis Rogers  (30 September 1917 – 7 December 1987) was a New Zealand doctor and local-body politician.

Biography
Rogers was born in Hamilton, New Zealand, and attended Nelson College from 1931 to 1934. He studied medicine at the University of Otago, graduating MB ChB in 1941, and became a general practitioner.

Rogers stood for the Hamilton City Council in 1956. He was the highest polling candidate and became deputy mayor. He was the mayor of Hamilton from 1959 to 1968, elected for three terms. During his mayoralty, he campaigned for the poor and for an international airport to be built in Hamilton.

Rogers was married to Helen Wyn-Hesse and they had three children. He was well known for his like of gardening, and the Rogers Rose Gardens in Hamilton are named after him.

In the 1964 Queen's Birthday Honours, Rogers was appointed an Officer of the Order of the British Empire, and in 1985 he was awarded the Freedom of the City of Hamilton. He died of a heart attack in 1987.

Rogers' brother, Rufus Rogers, was also a well-known political figure in Hamilton. Starting in 1956, a local campaign began to have a university in Hamilton. The barrister and solicitor Douglas Seymour chaired the lobby group for the first five years, to be succeeded by Rufus Rogers. In 1964, their work was done and the University of Waikato was officially opened by the Governor-General, Sir Bernard Fergusson. Denis Rogers was the university's first chancellor from 1964 to 1969.

References

External links 
 1960s photo

1917 births
1987 deaths
Mayors of Hamilton, New Zealand
Deputy mayors of places in New Zealand
New Zealand general practitioners
New Zealand Officers of the Order of the British Empire
People educated at Nelson College
Chancellors of the University of Waikato
20th-century New Zealand medical doctors
20th-century New Zealand politicians
New Zealand justices of the peace